Akim Frazer (born 2 May 1995) is a Jamaican cricketer. He made his first-class debut for Jamaica in the 2018–19 Regional Four Day Competition on 21 February 2019. On debut, he took eight wickets and was named the player of the match.

References

External links
 

1995 births
Living people
Jamaican cricketers
Jamaica cricketers
Place of birth missing (living people)